Nick or Nicholas Miller may refer to:

Nick Miller (American football) (born 1987), American football wide receiver
Nick Miller (artist) (born 1962), artist in Ireland
Nick Miller (Canadian football) (born 1931), Canadian football player
Nick Miller (cyclist) (born 1991), New Zealand racing cyclist
Nick Miller (hammer thrower) (born 1993), British hammer thrower
Nick Miller (politician), (born 1995), member of the Pennsylvania State Senate
Nick Miller (weather forecaster) (born 1970), British weather forecaster
Nick Miller (wrestler) (born 1985), ring name for Australian professional wrestler Mike Nicholls
Nicholas D. Miller, American DJ who goes by the stage name Illenium
Nick G. Miller (born 1964), American filmmaker and public speaker
Nicholas K. Miller (born c. 1959), American football player
Nicholas J. Miller, American professor of history
 Nick Miller (New Girl), a fictional character in the television sitcom New Girl